Gragg is an unincorporated community in Avery County, North Carolina, United States, spanning approximately one-half mile in radius from the intersection of Edgemont Road and Globe Road. Gragg can be accessed from US 221 via mile marker #305 on the Blue Ridge Parkway. The area was originally known as "'Carey's Flat'".

Photo gallery

See also
 Blue Ridge Parkway
 Brown Mountain
 Grandfather Mountain
 Grandmother Mountain
 Sugar Mountain

External links
 Gragg, NC
 Stack Rock Creek
 New Hopewell Baptist Church Cemetery

References

Unincorporated communities in Avery County, North Carolina
Unincorporated communities in North Carolina